Major General Maureen G. Banavige (born c. 1969) is a United States Air Force officer who has been serving as the mobilization assistant to the Commander, Air Force Reserve Command since August 2022. She served as the mobilization assistant to the Commander, Air Force Materiel Command from February 2019 to August 2022. Before this assignment, she served as the mobilization assistant to the Commander, Air Force Sustainment Center from August 2018 to February 2019.

Banavige was commissioned in 1991 through the Air Force ROTC program at Worcester Polytechnic Institute, Massachusetts. She served on active duty in various logistics roles at the field and program office levels before she joined the Air Force Reserve in 1996. She is a career logistics and maintenance officer who has commanded twice at the squadron level and once at the group level.

Education
1991 Bachelor of Science, Applied Mathematics, Worcester Polytechnic Institute, Worcester, Massachusetts
1992 Transportation Officer Course, Sheppard Air Force Base, Texas
1994 Master of Business Administration, Boston University, Boston
1994 Logistics Plans Officers Course, Lackland AFB, Texas
1999 Squadron Officer School, Maxwell AFB, Ala., by correspondence
2004 Air Command and Staff College, Maxwell AFB, Ala., by correspondence
2004 Aircraft Maintenance Officers Course, Sheppard AFB, Texas
2007 Air War College, Maxwell AFB, Ala., by correspondence
2008 Industrial College of the Armed Forces, Fort Lesley J. McNair, Washington, D.C.
2008 Master of Science, National Resource Strategy with special concentration in supply chain management, National Defense University, Fort Lesley J. McNair, Washington, D.C.
2016 LOGTECH Program for Executives in Logistics and Technology, University of North Carolina, Chapel Hill
2017 CAPSTONE, Fort Lesley J. McNair, Washington D.C.

Military assignments
 August 1992 – January 1994, transportation officer, 36th Transportation Squadron, Bitburg Air Base, Germany 
 January 1994 – July 1994, integrated logistics support manager, Navy programs, Joint Tactical Information, Distribution System, Joint Program Office, Hanscom Air Force Base, Mass. 
 July 1994 – June 1995, chief of software maintenance, Joint Tactical Information Distribution System, Joint Program Office, Hanscom AFB, Mass. 
 June 1995 – August 1996, chief of resource management, Joint Tactical Information Distribution System, Joint Program Office, Hanscom AFB, Mass. 
 August 1996, left active duty and joined the Air Force Reserves 
 August 1996 – April 1999, transportation officer, 934th Logistics Readiness Squadron, Minneapolis-St. Paul International Airport Air Reserve Station, Minn. 
 April 1999 – December 2000, commander, 934th LRS, Minneapolis-St. Paul International Airport ARS, Minn. 
 December 2000 – December 2003, deputy commander, 934th Maintenance Group, Minneapolis-St. Paul International Airport ARS, Minn. 
 December 2003 – June 2007, commander of 934th Maintenance Squadron, Minneapolis-St. Paul International Airport ARS, Minn.  (December 2005 – June 2006, Program Manager, Iraqi Air Force Mobility Programs (C-130 and helicopter platforms) Multinational Security Transition Command-Iraq/Coalition Air Force Transition Team, Baghdad) 
 August 2007 – June 2008, student, Industrial College of the Armed Forces, Fort Lesley J. McNair, Washington, D.C. 
 August 2008 – February 2011, individual mobilization assistant to the Chief, Logistics Operations Division, Directorate of Logistics, Headquarters Air Mobility Command, Scott AFB, Ill. 
 February 2011 – December 2012, commander, 459th Maintenance Group, Joint Base Andrews, Md. 
 January 2013 – April 2015, mobilization assistant to the Commander, Oklahoma City Air Logistics Complex, Tinker AFB, Okla. 
 April 2015 – October 2017, mobilization assistant to the director of Logistics, Engineering and Force Protection, Air Combat Command, Joint Base Langley-Eustis, Va. 
 October 2017 – August 2018, mobilization assistant to the Commander, Air Force Life Cycle Management Center, Wright-Patterson AFB, Ohio. 
 August 2018 – February 2019, mobilization assistant to the Commander, Air Force Sustainment Center, Tinker AFB, Okla. 
 February 2019 – August 2022, mobilization assistant to the Commander, Air Force Materiel Command, Wright-Patterson AFB, Ohio
 August 2022 – present, mobilization assistant to the Commander, Air Force Reserve Command, Robins AFB, Ga.

Effective dates of promotion 
  Second lieutenant (May 18, 1991)
  First lieutenant (November 25, 1993)
  Captain (November 25, 1995)
  Major (June 2, 2000)
  Lieutenant colonel (September 30, 2004)
  Colonel (August 15, 2008)
  Brigadier general (March 26, 2015)
  Major general (December 12, 2018)

References 

Living people
Worcester Polytechnic Institute alumni
Boston University alumni
Recipients of the Legion of Merit
United States Air Force generals
Year of birth missing (living people)